In mathematics, the tautological one-form is a special 1-form defined on the cotangent bundle  of a manifold  In physics, it is used to create a correspondence between the velocity of a point in a mechanical system and its momentum, thus providing a bridge between Lagrangian mechanics and Hamiltonian mechanics (on the manifold ). 

The exterior derivative of this form defines a symplectic form giving  the structure of a symplectic manifold. The tautological one-form plays an important role in relating the formalism of Hamiltonian mechanics and Lagrangian mechanics. The tautological one-form is sometimes also called the Liouville one-form, the Poincaré one-form, the canonical one-form, or the symplectic potential. A similar object is the canonical vector field on the tangent bundle.

Any coordinates on  that preserve this definition, up to a total differential (exact form), may be called canonical coordinates; transformations between different canonical coordinate systems are known as canonical transformations.

The canonical symplectic form, also known as the Poincaré two-form, is given by

The extension of this concept to general fibre bundles is known as the solder form. By convention, one uses the phrase "canonical form" whenever the form has a unique, canonical definition, and one uses the term "solder form", whenever an arbitrary choice has to be made.  In algebraic geometry and complex geometry the term "canonical" is discouraged, due to confusion with the canonical class, and the term "tautological" is preferred, as in tautological bundle.

Coordinate-free definition
The tautological 1-form can also be defined rather abstractly as a form on phase space.  Let  be a manifold and  be the cotangent bundle or phase space. Let 

be the canonical fiber bundle projection, and let 

be the induced tangent map.  Let  be a point on  Since  is the cotangent bundle, we can understand  to be a map of the tangent space at :

That is, we have that  is in the fiber of  The tautological one-form  at point  is then defined to be

It is a linear map

and so

Symplectic potential
The symplectic potential is generally defined a bit more freely, and also only defined locally: it is any one-form  such that ; in effect, symplectic potentials differ from the canonical 1-form by a closed form.

Properties
The tautological one-form is the unique one-form that "cancels" pullback.  That is, let  

So, by the commutation between the pull-back and the exterior derivative,

Action

In more prosaic terms, the Hamiltonian flow represents the classical trajectory of a mechanical system obeying the Hamilton-Jacobi equations of motion. The Hamiltonian flow is the integral of the Hamiltonian vector field, and so one writes, using traditional notation for action-angle variables:

with the integral understood to be taken over the manifold defined by holding the energy  constant:

On Riemannian and Pseudo-Riemannian Manifolds
If the manifold  has a Riemannian or pseudo-Riemannian metric  then corresponding definitions can be made in terms of generalized coordinates.  Specifically, if we take the metric to be a map

then define

and 

In generalized coordinates  on  one has

and 

The metric allows one to define a unit-radius sphere in  The canonical one-form restricted to this sphere forms a contact structure; the contact structure may be used to generate the geodesic flow for this metric.

References

 Ralph Abraham and Jerrold E. Marsden, Foundations of Mechanics, (1978) Benjamin-Cummings, London  See section 3.2.

Symplectic geometry
Hamiltonian mechanics
Lagrangian mechanics